Alfred Palmerston Cobden (9 May 1913 – 24 October 1942) was a New Zealand cricketer. He played in two first-class matches for Canterbury in 1935/36. He was killed in action during World War II.

See also
 List of Canterbury representative cricketers

References

External links
 

1913 births
1942 deaths
New Zealand cricketers
Canterbury cricketers
Cricketers from Christchurch
New Zealand military personnel killed in World War II